The 1984 WFA Cup Final was the 14th final of the WFA Cup, England's primary cup competition for women's football teams. The showpiece event was played under the auspices of the Women's Football Association (WFA).

Match

Summary

Howbury Grange and Doncaster Belles contested the match at Loftus Road in Lincoln on 6 May 1984. Howbury won 4-2.

References

External links
 
 Report at WomensFACup.co.uk

Cup
Women's FA Cup finals
Doncaster Rovers Belles L.F.C. matches
May 1986 sports events in the United Kingdom